ISO 3166-2:EH is the entry for Western Sahara in ISO 3166-2, part of the ISO 3166 standard published by the International Organization for Standardization (ISO), which defines codes for the names of the principal subdivisions (e.g., provinces or states) of all countries coded in ISO 3166-1.

Currently no ISO 3166-2 codes are defined in the entry for Western Sahara.

Western Sahara, a disputed territory de facto controlled by Morocco and claimed by the Sahrawi Arab Democratic Republic, is officially assigned the ISO 3166-1 alpha-2 code . Moreover, the following regions, provinces and prefectures of Morocco located in the territory of Western Sahara are assigned ISO 3166-2 codes under the entry for Morocco:
 Dakhla-Oued Ed-Dahab (entirely in Western Sahara) 
 Aousserd (entirely in Western Sahara) 
 Oued Ed-Dahab (entirely in Western Sahara) 
 Guelmim-Oued Noun (partially in Western Sahara) 
 Assa-Zag (partially in Western Sahara) 
 Tan-Tan (partially in Western Sahara) 
 Laâyoune-Sakia El Hamra (partially in Western Sahara)
 Boujdour (entirely in Western Sahara) 
 Es-Semara (partially in Western Sahara) 
 Laâyoune (entirely in Western Sahara)
 Tarfaya (partially in Western Sahara)

External links
 ISO Online Browsing Platform: EH
 Provinces of Western Sahara, Statoids.com

2:EH
Geography of Western Sahara